The 1869 Massachusetts gubernatorial election was held on November 2.

Governor William Clafin was re-elected to a second consecutive one-year term, defeating Democrat John Quincy Adams II and Edwin Chamberlain, the nominee of the new Labor Reform Party.

General election

Candidates
John Quincy Adams II, former State Representative from Quincy and nominee for Governor in 1868 (Democratic)
Edwin Chamberlain (Labor Reform)
William Claflin, incumbent Governor (Republican)

Results

See also
 1869 Massachusetts legislature

References

Governor
1869
Massachusetts
November 1869 events